Bring It All Back 2015 was the fourth concert tour by English pop band S Club 7. It was their first concert tour in 12 years.

Tour dates

 17 May was an extra date added due to popular demand.

Setlist 
 "Bring the House Down"
 "S Club Party"
 "You're My Number One"
 "Love Ain't Gonna Wait for You"
 "Two in a Million"
 "Alive"
 "Stronger" 
 "Reach"  
 "Straight Up" 
 "Hello Friend" 
 "Natural"
 "Have You Ever"
 "You"
 Medley Remix: "Good Times"/"Friday Night"/"Dance Dance Dance"/"Do It Till We Drop"/"Who Do You Think You Are?" 
 "Some Girls"/"Sweet Dreams My LA Ex" 
 "Viva La Fiesta"
 "Bring It All Back"
 "Uptown Funk" 
 "Say Goodbye"
 "Reach"
Encore
 "Never Had a Dream Come True"
 "Don’t Stop Movin'"

Support Acts
• AJ 7 May 2015 – 21 May 2015 https://web.archive.org/web/20170118031635/http://www.theofficialaj.com/

References

External links
S Club 7 website
S Club 7 on Twitter

2015 concert tours
S Club 7
2015 in British music
Concert tours of the United Kingdom